Ahmed Al-Hasan has been called the most prominent of figures claiming to be the messianic Promised al-Yamani,  in the chaos following the US invasion of Iraq in 2003.
In Twelver Shi'ism Islam, the majority religion of Iraq, al-Yamani is "the deputy of the Mahdi,  the Twelfth Imam, and a precursor to his Reappearance" and to End Times. 

Al-Hasan, who was born and lives (or lived) in Iraq, publicly began his "religious call" in 2002.   As of April 2019, his whereabouts was unknown.

Life 
Ahmad al-Hassan was born in Basra, Iraq. His uncle, Muhsin ibn Saleh, attested that the family tree traces back to Muhammad al-Mahdi. This was corroborated by Sayyed Hasan bin Muhammad Ali al-Hamami (son of the late Marja' Sayed Muhammad Ali Musawi al-Hamami, a tribal leader from Bani Abas) and two other regional clerics.

In an interview given in 2007, Ahmed Al-Hasan reported that he had received a bachelors degree in Civil Engineering while living in Basra, Iraq. He also reportedly received seminary education in Najaf in the school of Sayyed Mohammad al-Sadr.

Religious call 

Ahmad al-Hassan started his religious call privately, only first announcing it publicly in 2002, during the last months of Saddam's rule, after his attempted Hawza reformations. Middle East Research and Information Project has reported that "the majority of his public affrays—they often take the form of theological duels known as munazarat—have been with Sadrist followers."

Al-Hasan is referred to as the savior of mankind on his official website.

Current status 
As of April 2019, Al-Hassan's  whereabouts was unknown.

Claims 

Regarding the purposes of his movement, he claimed:

Supporters and opponents

Supporters
The adherents of Ahmad al-Hassan collectively identify themselves as Ansar al-Mahdi ( supporters of the Mahdi), (also Ansar al-Imam al-Mahdī), and are sometimes called Ansars. His followers have described his call as being universal,  because his preaching addresses Muslims, Christians, Jews, and all of mankind.

Many of his supporters are in his  native  land, Iraq. While his prominence has wained since his first burst of publicity,    there are reportedly  "more than 15 official public offices and representatives in major cities" there. 
He is believed to have followers in many other countries as well, including  Iran, Indonesia, Pakistan, Afghanistan, the United States and Australia. And his websites provide teachings in several languages. In Iran, the Yamani movement is said to have "more than 6,000" converts and to be more popular among  clerics than lay people, especially due to clerics being more knowledgeable  eschatological hadiths and because of the similarities between al-Hassan's characteristics and the descriptions given of the promised al-Yamani in the Shīʿa scriptures.  This support has begun to cause friction with the Iranian government, whose supreme leader also claims to be the deputy of the  Mahdi.

Soldiers of Heaven, who were defeated in the late January 2007 "Battle of Najaf" by Iraqi and American forces, have been called "the most radical" members of his group Ansar, though al-Hassan has explicitly disavowed the group (see below). Jean-Pierre Filiu, describes Ansar's rhetoric as becoming more radical since its founding -- with attacks on America for being "at war with Allah", Wahhabis for being "Satanic", and Ayatollahs for allegedly being guilty of "aberration and treason, of occupation and tyranny". In clashes between "millenarian rebels" and police during the 2008 Ashura, a reported 18 officers and 53 militia members were killed.

Opponents and controversies
Al-Hassan also has "websites, several Telegram (a popular instant messaging service in Iran) channels, and dozens of books" devoted to debunking him.

Mahdi claim 
The al-Yamani is one of the major signs that is awaited by Shi'a Muslims before the appearance of the 12th Imam Mahdi. The Shia clerics that are informed about Ahmad al-Hassan's call have largely condemned him, and issued corresponding fatwas classifying Ahmad al-Hassan as an impostor, a fabricator, a deceiver, an innovator, and a liar. According to Iraqi Basra police, investigations conducted revealed that his ancestry does not go back to the prophet. Shi'a Muslim scholars such as Sheikh Ali al-Korani and Jalal al-Din Ali al-Saghir have expressed their negative views of al-Hassan's claims in numerous TV broadcasts. He has been accused by his opponents of plotting to assassinate Grand Ayatollah Ali al-Sistani.

An example of his opposition is a question  and  answer in the pro-Islamic Republic of Iran, Shi'i website "Al-Islam": 
Question: What do scholars  say about Ahmad al-Hassan, who "makes a various claims, including being  the son, messenger, vicegerent, and executor of the affairs of Imam Mahdi, al-Yamani, an infallible Imam, the first of 12 Mahdis."
Reply: "he is a liar. He has been appointed and financially supported by our enemies to create dispute and cause trouble among the followers of Ahlul Bayt" (i.e. Shia Muslims).

Al-Hassan claims that Shia Muslims are being "deceived" by the Marja'. He claims that imitating (following and obeying) a scholar is not obligatory for Muslims, and it is considered Shirk (polytheism) to blindly follow a scholar.

Battle of Najaf 
Shortly after the January 2007 Battle of Najaf, conflicting reports and news coverage emerged as to who exactly was involved in the clashes. The Los Angeles Times and RFERL identified the leader of the Soldiers of Heaven group as Dia Abdul Zahra Kadim, who was killed in the clashes. However, The New York Times reported that Iraqi officials at a press conference had named the group that was involved in the clashes as Soldiers of Heaven (Jund al-Samaa’), but offered several names for the group's leader, including Ahmad Ismail and Diyah Abdul Zahraa Khadom. The Times article also reported that Diyah Abdul Zahraa Khadom was the same person as Ahmad Hassan al-Yamani, and whose alleged role was deputy of the group, not the leader.

Timothy Furnish of mahdiwatch.org wrote, "Security officials say that Ansar Ahmad [al-Hassan] al-Yamani and the Jund al-Samaa [Soldiers of Heaven] are one and the same, while National Security Minister Shirwan al-Waili denies any relation between the two [groups]."

Sheikh Saadiq al-Hasnawi, who is a teacher in the Scientific Hawza of Honorable Najaf says, "This movement (Soldiers of Heaven), we have never heard about it before, and we used to guess that the leader of it is Sayed Ahmad al-Yamani, and they told me about the book Qathi al-Sama which was spread around in multitudes and by anonymous people, and when I read the content of the book I was shocked in its strange ideas completely, over the method of Ahmad son of al-Hassan al-Yamani."

Sayyed Hasan bin Muhammad Ali al-Hamami (son of the late Marja Sayed Muhammad Ali Musawi al-Hamami) states that Soldiers of Heaven was led by Dhiyaa' [Abdul-Zahra] Al-Qara'wi, who had rejected the 12 Imams of Shia Islam, had claimed to be the 12th Imam Mahdi himself, and had later died in the battle.

Ahmad al-Hassan himself and representatives of his group Ansar of Imam al-Mahdi have denied any involvement in these clashes, and claim they have no links to the group Soldiers of Heaven.

Books 
Ahmad al-Hassan's books which are translated into English:

 Atheism Delusion
 For the Supremacy of God, not for the Supremacy of the People
 They ask you about the Spirit
 The Successor and Messenger of Imam Al-Mahdi pbuh in the Torah, Gospel, Quran
 The Journey of Moses to the junction of the Two Seas
 The Thirteenth Disciple
 The Sealing Prophecy
 Letter of Guidance
 Enlightenments from the calls of the Messengers
 The Wilderness or the Path to God
 The Allegories
 The Return

References

Citations

Bibliography

Iraqi Shia Muslims
1968 births
Living people
Self-declared messiahs
University of Basrah alumni
Critics of atheism
Mahdism
Founders of new religious movements